Rufous winged bush lark may refer to:

 Red-winged lark, a species of lark found in eastern Africa
 Bengal bush lark, a species of lark found in South Asia